Colleyville Heritage High School (CHHS) is a public secondary school in Colleyville, Texas in the Dallas-Fort Worth area. The school is a part of the Grapevine-Colleyville Independent School District and serves freshmen through senior students in Colleyville and the surrounding areas of Tarrant County. In 2018 and onwards the school met standards for student achievement, student progress, closing performance gaps, postsecondary readiness, and earned distinction in English language arts/reading, mathematics, history business computer engineering interior design politics philosophy parenting and science. The school had 2000 population between 2019-2020 

Its attendance boundary includes sections of Colleyville, Grapevine, and Euless.

Campus
It has a coffeeshop.
Panther Field at Colleyville-Heritage

Controversy over principal
On September 1, 2021, James Whitfieldthe high school's first Black principalwas suspended for allegedly promoting Critical Race Theory (CRT), an accusation that Whitfield has repeatedly denied. In support of Whitfield, students held walkouts, then joined their parents and 3 dozen teachers to meet with the school district's board of trustees, pleading with them to reinstate the popular principal. At a July 26 school board meeting, Stetson Clarka former school board candidateaccused Whitfield of promoting CRT, while several people in attendance yelled, "Fire him." Clark based his accusation on an open letter Whitfield wrote in the summer of 2020 about his concerns over the murders of Ahmoud Arbery and George Floyd, and the killing of Breonna Taylor. One of the same parents has previously attacked Whitfield for posting a photograph on his personal social media accounts depicting him and his wife on a beach. Whitfield, whose wife is white, viewed the criticism as predicated on their status as an interracial couple. Whitfield removed the photo after a formal request from the school district. On June 15, 2021, Texas Governor Greg Abbott became the third state governorfollowing Idaho and Tennesseeto pass legislation making the teaching of CRT illegal. The Texas House Bill 3979 and the follow-up legislationSenate Bill 3authored by Senator Bryan Hughes, came into effect on September 1, 2021. Whitfield's suspension is set against the backdrop of debates on the impact of similar legislation in a number of states across the country.

On November 8 the school district announced a “settlement and separation agreement” with Whitfield. He was placed on paid administrative leave until August 2023. Whitfield is not allowed to discuss the details of the settlement.

Notable alumni

 Jaimie Alexander, actress
 Maxx Crosby, NFL football player
 Annie Ilonzeh, actress
 Kyle Kubitza, MLB third baseman
 Stephen Lambdin, Olympian in Tae Kwan Do
 Christian Ponder, NFL quarterback
 James Russell, MLB pitcher
 Cody Thomas, MLB outfielder
 Bobby Witt Jr., MLB player
 Adam Zimmer, NFL coach

See also
 2020s controversies around critical race theory Section Anti-CRT school boards firings and suspensions

References

External links 

 

1996 establishments in Texas
Colleyville, Texas
Educational institutions established in 1996
Grapevine-Colleyville Independent School District high schools
Public high schools in Tarrant County, Texas